The temporal fascia covers the temporalis muscle.

It is a strong, fibrous investment, covered, laterally, by the auricularis anterior and superior, by the galea aponeurotica, and by part of the orbicularis oculi.

The superficial temporal vessels and the auriculotemporal nerve cross it from below upward.

Superiorly, it is a single layer, attached to the entire extent of the superior temporal line; but inferiorly, where it is fixed to the zygomatic arch, it consists of two layers, one of which is inserted into the lateral, and the other into the medial border of the arch.

A small quantity of fat, the orbital branch of the superficial temporal artery, and a filament from the zygomatic branch of the maxillary nerve, are contained between these two layers.

It affords attachment by its deep surface to the superficial fibers of the temporalis.

The parotid fascia proceeds to the temporal fascia.

References 

Fascial spaces of the head and neck